Hotel Transylvania is an American animated media franchise created by comedy writer Todd Durham and produced by Sony Pictures Animation. It consists of four feature films, three short films, a flash-animated TV series, and several  video games. The series features an ensemble cast, usually led by the voices of Adam Sandler, Andy Samberg, Selena Gomez, Kevin James, Steve Buscemi, Keegan-Michael Key, David Spade, Fran Drescher and Molly Shannon among others.

The first film, Hotel Transylvania, was released in September 2012, with two sequels, Hotel Transylvania 2 and Hotel Transylvania 3: Summer Vacation, were released in September 2015 and July 2018, respectively. The films have received mixed reviews from critics and grossed over $1.3 billion worldwide against a combined production budget of $245 million. A fourth and final installment titled Hotel Transylvania: Transformania was released on Amazon Prime Video on January 14, 2022 which also received mixed reviews from critics as well.

The series focused on the adventures surrounding monsters who reside in the titular Hotel Transylvania, a plaza hotel where monsters can relax and get away from humans due to fear of persecution. Most of the characters are based on or are parodies of the Universal Movie Monsters.

Origin
Comedy writer Todd Durham came up with the concept of Hotel Transylvania and brought it to Sony Pictures Animation.

Films

Hotel Transylvania (2012)

Hotel Transylvania  is the first movie of the franchise and it was released in theatres on September 28, 2012. It is about a human named Johnny (Andy Samberg), who accidentally stumbles upon the hotel and instantly falls in love with Dracula's teenage daughter, Mavis (Selena Gomez), and eventually dates her, despite Dracula (Adam Sandler) attempting to keep Johnny away from his daughter.

Hotel Transylvania 2 (2015)

Hotel Transylvania 2 is the second movie of the franchise and it was released in theatres on September 25, 2015. It is about Mavis and Johnny, who have a half-human/half-vampire son named Dennis. Mavis thinks Hotel Transylvania isn't the right place to raise Dennis and wants to raise him in California. When Dracula is disappointed that Dennis does not have any vampire abilities, he helps his friends make his grandson a vampire. Things get complicated when Dracula's father Vlad (Mel Brooks) shows up.

Hotel Transylvania 3: Summer Vacation (2018)

Hotel Transylvania 3: Summer Vacation is the third movie of the franchise and it was released in theatres on July 13, 2018. It is about Dracula falling for Ericka (Kathryn Hahn), a great-granddaughter of monster hunter Van Helsing (Jim Gaffigan), while on a cruise ship with his family.

Hotel Transylvania: Transformania (2022)

Hotel Transylvania: Transformania is the fourth and final movie of the franchise and it was released on streaming through Amazon Prime Video on January 14, 2022. It is about Dracula, now voiced by Brian Hull, and Johnny teaming up to find a cure to turn themselves back into their old selves before their transformations become permanent.

Television series

A television series based on the film premiered on June 25, 2017, and ended on October 29, 2020. Developed and produced by Nelvana Limited, in partnership with Sony Pictures Animation, the prequel series focused on the 114/115 years of Mavis and her friends at the Hotel Transylvania. Sony Pictures Television handled distribution in the United States, while Nelvana distributed the series outside the United States. It aired on the Disney Channel worldwide.

Short films

Goodnight Mr. Foot (2012)

Goodnight Mr. Foot is a traditionally animated short film based on Hotel Transylvania, featuring Bigfoot from the film. Premiering in time for Halloween, on October 26, 2012, the short was shown exclusively in Regal Entertainment Group Cinemas, before the theatrical shows of Hotel Transylvania. As Sony Pictures Animation's first traditionally animated film, it was written and directed by Genndy Tartakovsky himself, who also animated the short with the help of Rough Draft Studios. Animated in the style of Bob Clampett, Tex Avery, and Chuck Jones, Tartakovsky created the short in four weeks during the final production stages of the main film. Bigfoot (who had a non-speaking role in Hotel Transylvania) was voiced by Corey Burton while the Witch Maid was voiced by Rose Abdoo. Both voice actors provided additional voices in Hotel Transylvania.

Taking place before the events of Hotel Transylvania, the short stars Bigfoot, whose rest in Hotel Transylvania is being constantly disturbed by an overly enthusiastic witch maid.

Puppy! (2017)

Puppy! is a CG-animated fantasy comedy short film based on Hotel Transylvania, featuring Dennis (voiced by Asher Blinkoff) from Hotel Transylvania 2, with the additional voices of Selena Gomez, reprising her role as Mavis, Andy Samberg as Johnny, and Adam Sandler as Dracula. The film was written and directed by veteran director of the Hotel Transylvania movies, Genndy Tartakovsky, and was shown in theaters alongside The Emoji Movie, which was released in the United States on July 28, 2017. The film is set in the hotel, as Dennis convinces Dracula to give him a monster-sized puppy named Tinkles, and the hotel learns to cope with it. The short is a sneak preview of the third film, Hotel Transylvania 3: Summer Vacation, which was released on July 13, 2018.

Monster Pets (2021)

Monster Pets is a Hotel Transylvania short film, featuring Dracula trying to find a pet companion for his lively puppy, Tinkles. The short was played exclusively at Cinemark Theatres on the weekend following April 1, 2021, before select PG-rated films, and was released online on April 9, 2021. It was directed by Jennifer Kluska and Derek Drymon, written by Kluska and produced by Christian Roedel. The short marked the first time that Adam Sandler did not return to voice Dracula and was replaced by voice actor Brian Hull. Hull would reprise the role in the film Hotel Transylvania: Transformania.

Reception

Box office performance

Critical and public response

Cast and characters

 A dark gray cell indicates the character did not appear in that installment.
 A  indicates an actor or actress voiced a younger version of their character.

 A grey cell indicates character did not appear in that medium.

Crew

Video games
A social game based on the film, titled Hotel Transylvania Social Game and made by Sony Pictures Interactive, was released on August 15, 2012. The game allows players to create their own Hotel Transylvania, where they must take care of the hotel's guests.

Another video game, titled Hotel Transylvania, developed by WayForward Technologies and published by GameMill Entertainment, was released on September 18, 2012, for Nintendo DS and Nintendo 3DS at retail. The Nintendo 3DS version of the game was also released digitally in the Nintendo eShop in North America on November 15, 2012.

A mobile game, titled Hotel Transylvania Dash, developed by Sony Pictures Consumer Products Inc. and PlayFirst, was released to iTunes App Store on September 20, 2012. The game is a variation of Hotel Dash and features the film's art and characters.

A mobile digital storybook app, titled Hotel Transylvania BooClips Deluxe, developed by Castle Builders and Sony Pictures Animation, was released on the iTunes App Store, Nook Store, Google Play for Android, iBookstore, Microsoft's Metro, and for PC and Mac via BooClips, both in English and in Spanish, on September 20, 2012.

A third video game based on Hotel Transylvania 3: Summer Vacation, Hotel Transylvania 3 Monsters Overboard, published by Outright Games, was released on July 13, 2018.

A video game based on the franchise, Hotel Transylvania: Scary-Tale Adventures, developed by Drakhar Studio and published by Outright Games, was released for Microsoft Windows, PlayStation 4, PlayStation 5, Nintendo Switch, and Xbox One on March 11, 2022.

Theme park attractions
In December 2016, a dark ride based on the franchise opened at Motiongate Dubai, in Dubai, United Arab Emirates. In April 2021, another ride based on the film series opened at Dream Island in Moscow, Russia. In October 2021, a new themed-land, based on the film franchise, opened at Columbia Pictures Aquaverse in Sattahip, Chonburi, Thailand.

References

External links

 
 
 
 
 Monster Pets short on YouTube

Animated film series
Film series introduced in 2012
English-language films
Fantasy film franchises
Children's film series
Comedy film franchises
Hotel Transylvania
Columbia Pictures franchises
Sony Pictures Animation franchises